Hawa N'Diaye (born 24 July 1995) is a Senegalese handball player for Siófok KC and the Senegalese national team.

She competed at the 2019 World Women's Handball Championship in Japan.

References

External links

1995 births
Living people
Senegalese female handball players
Sportspeople from Strasbourg
French female handball players
French sportspeople of Senegalese descent
Black French sportspeople
20th-century Senegalese women
21st-century Senegalese women